Senator Griffith may refer to:

Frederick W. Griffith (1858–1928), New York State Senate
Henry W. Griffith (1897–1956), New York State Senate
Melony G. Griffith (born 1963), Maryland State Senate
Parker Griffith (born 1942), Alabama State Senate
Silas L. Griffith (1837–1903), Vermont State Senate